Rylie Wilcox is an Australian rules footballer playing for the Western Bulldogs Football Club in the AFL Women's (AFLW). Wilcox was recruited by the Bulldogs with the 22nd pick in the 2022 AFL Women's draft.

Early life
Wilcox played for the Northern Knights in the NAB League Girls for the 2021 and 2022 seasons. Wilcox was noted as a very 'crafty' prospect who can play as a small forward or on the wing. After averaging 16 disposals and kicking 2 goals from  her three games for Vic Metro in the 2022 AFL Women's Under-19 Championships, Wilcox was named in the 2022 AFLW National Championships All-Australian team on the interchange bench.

AFL Women's career
On debut, Wilcox collected 13 disposals and 2 marks. Wilcox earned a Rising star nomination after her round 3 performance against  after her 11 disposals and a goal helped the Bulldogs to continue their unbeaten streak. At the conclusion of the year, Wilcox finished in the top 5 of the 2022 AFL Women's Rising Star count, gaining 10 votes. She was also nominated for the 22 Under 22 team, but did not make a place in the final team.

Statistics
Updated to the end of S7 (2022)

|-
| S7 (2022) ||  || 37
| 10 || 5 || 3 || 74 || 32 || 106 || 18 || 22 || 0.5 || 0.3 || 7.4 || 3.2 || 10.6 || 1.8 || 2.2 || 0
|- class=sortbottom
! colspan=3 | Career
! 10 !! 5 !! 3 !! 74 !! 32 !! 106 !! 18 !! 22 !! 0.5 !! 0.3 !! 7.4 !! 3.2 !! 10.6 !! 1.8 !! 2.2 !! 0
|}

Honours and achievements
 AFL Women's Rising Star nominee: S7

References

External links
 Rylie Wilcox at AustralianFootball.com
 

2004 births
Living people
Western Bulldogs (AFLW) players
Australian rules footballers from Victoria (Australia)